The 1961 National Invitation Tournament was the 1961 edition of the annual NCAA college basketball competition.

Selected teams
Below is a list of the 12 teams selected for the tournament.

 Army
 Colorado State
 Dayton
 DePaul
 Detroit
 Holy Cross
 Memphis
 Miami (FL)
 Niagara
 Providence
 Saint Louis
 Temple

Bracket
Below is the tournament bracket.

See also
 1961 NCAA University Division basketball tournament
 1961 NCAA College Division basketball tournament
 1961 NAIA Division I men's basketball tournament

References

National Invitation
National Invitation Tournament
1960s in Manhattan
Basketball in New York City
College sports in New York City
Madison Square Garden
National Invitation Tournament
National Invitation Tournament
Sports competitions in New York City
Sports in Manhattan